Unionville High School is a public high school of the York Region District School Board in Ontario, Canada. It is located west of the community of Unionville in the city of Markham. The school is located next to the Markham Civic Centre and the Markham Theatre.

Unionville High School is most well known for its enriched arts program, Arts Unionville (formerly known as Arts York). The school was purpose-built to house this regional arts program, therefore it has enhanced arts facilities. Arts Unionville is divided into 4 categories: visual arts, music, dance, and drama. In order to gain entry into the program, grade eight to nine students are required to audition.

History
In the mid-1970s, Superintendent Stephen Bacsalmsi proposed the idea of an advanced arts program for the region. The Ontario government accepted the idea, but needed to wait for a new high school to be built. When Unionville High School was under construction, the government decided it was a prime opportunity to initiate the program. The school was finished and opened to the public in 1985, with the schools west wing constructed in the Spring of 2002.

Unionville High School also became the first school outside the United States to participate in the Apple Digital Campus Curriculum (ADCC) in 2002.

In 2005, Sheila Hetherington and Jerry Berridge, teachers in the history and tech departments, were recipients of the Governor General's Awards for Excellence in Teaching Canadian History. In 2006, the same two teachers later received the Prime Minister's Awards for Teaching Excellence. For the 2007-08 teaching year, Donna McAdam was a recipient of the Premier's Awards for Teaching Excellence.
The two documentaries created during this course, When We Were Young and Never Shall We Forget, were of broadcast standard and aired on TVO.

Facilities
The facilities at Unionville High include a visual arts room, communication/media lab, construction lab, design and technology lab, dance studios, music rooms, music practice rooms, drama rooms, a black box theatre, family studies labs, a photography blackroom, science labs, a resource centre, classrooms, a guidance office, two gymnasiums, two outdoor fields, an outdoor track, a weight room, washrooms and shower facilities, student cafeteria with microwaves and vending machines, a student council office, a yearbook office, student parking facilities, a staff dining room, and staff workrooms.

There are approximately 300 computers in the school, divided between 9 computer labs. Notably, two of the computer labs employ Apple computers, as a part of the Apple Digital Campus.

While officially being two separate properties, the school as well as the Markham Theatre are connected via a tunnel. The theatre occasionally hosts school assemblies as well as performances from the Arts Unionville program.

Programs

Arts Unionville program
Arts Unionville, formally known as Arts York, is a four-year program that high school students take concurrently with the mainstream academic program. The high school enrolls students from all over the Greater Toronto Area. In 2010, due to school board changes, Arts York was forced to change their program name to Arts Unionville and will only take students from the Markham area, except for piano and stringed instruments.  Class 2012 was the last year of Arts York. However, in the 2009–10 school year, the program was renamed "Arts Unionville" 
Shortly after, the York Region District School Board removed funding for busing, thus eliminating transportation means for long-distance students attending the program. As a result, students were forced to drop out. The decision was protested by many parents and students, and after hiring a lawyer, they settled out of court to have funding for bus transportation reinstated for the rest of the 2008–2009 school year. Students living in areas not around Unionville were expected to attend arts schools in their own districts. As a result, the pool of talent for these programs has significantly declined.

Musical arts

The Musical Arts department is the biggest section of Arts Unionville at Unionville High School. There are four classrooms for music situated in the east wing of the school directly adjacent to the underground link to the Markham Theatre. With its strategic placement, it is often said amongst faculty, staff, and students that the Music department is located in its own east wing.

The Arts Unionville Music program is separated into six categories: piano, winds, strings, vocal, brass, and percussion.

Visual arts

The Visual Arts program provides opportunities for individual creative and imaginative growth as well as development of technical skills. In this program, students are introduced to both traditional and experimental perspectives in painting and drawing. They will also be specializing in sculpture, photography, digital, printmaking (etching and silkscreen), and video. Students will also study art history and will learn to critically analyze their own work, enabling the students to discover individual strengths and directions. For the purpose of developing the aptitudes of talented students interested in the Visual Arts, programs are offered in all four years.

Dramatic arts

The Drama Department explores university level dramatic arts.  Disciplines such as mask, mime, clown and Shakespeare are presented to the actors and explored through self-discovery.

Dance arts

Dance arts is another popular program in Arts Unionville. This program focuses on the development of creativity, artistry, and technique needed to improve dance expression. Students in this program are given opportunities to participate in dance programs such as Dance Access, and The Nutcracker productions in December staged by the National Ballet of Canada.

Academic achievement
Students at Unionville High School has in recent years performed very well in academics, whether it be in compulsory provincial testing, or in extra-curricular academic competitions. Academically, the Fraser institute 2014 Report Card gave the high school a rating of 9.5/10 and a rank of second out of 740 schools in Ontario, and sixth out of 690 schools in Ontario over the past five years. When the Fraser Institute originally began publishing report on Ontario secondary schools in 2001, Unionville was rated at 8.9/10 and ranked at 36 out of 568 schools and 21 out of 349 in Ontario.

Provincial assessment
Each year, Grade 9 students across Ontario are issued province-wide standardized tests in Mathematics. The tests themselves are administered by the Ontario Education Quality and Accountability Office (EQAO). The Mathematics assessment is graded under the Ontario rubric, where level 3 is considered the provincial standard, and level 4 is considered above the provincial standard. In the 2012–13 academic year:
34% of Unionville students, enrolled in the academic program, scored level 4 in EQAO Math Assessment (only 13% of all students in Ontario achieved this standard).
97% of Unionville students, enrolled in the academic program, scored level 3 or above in EQAO Math Assessment (only 84% of Ontario students achieved this standard).

In addition to the Grade 9 mathematics assessment, EQAO also administers the Ontario Secondary School Literacy Test, a standardized test for high school students in Ontario who wish to graduate from an Ontario secondary school and obtain their Ontario Secondary School Diploma. The test is written every year on the last Thursday of March in all public secondary schools including Unionville. In the 2009 testing:
96% of Unionville students who were taking the test for the first time passed the Ontario Secondary School Literacy Test, (compared to an 82% success rate for the province as a whole).

Extra-curricular competitions
The school itself has also formed extra-curricular clubs or teams to compete in academic competitions such as the national Reach for the Top trivia game show and the Distributive Education Clubs of America (DECA). Several students representing the school have been sent to represent the province in international DECA competitions, and in some cases, achieving stellar results during the competition. Students also have the opportunity to compete in the Canadian Open Mathematics Challenge (COMC) each year as individuals and as a part of the school team each year.

Clubs and extracurricular activities

Sports
Besides the school's arts programs, the school also has a respectable athletics program competing in the York Region Athletic Association and OFSAA. Following are some of the sports in which the school participates:

Basketball - Jr./Sr. Boys Jr./Sr. Girls
Volleyball - Jr./Sr. Boys Jr./Sr. Girls
Ice Hockey - Jr./Sr. Boys, Girls
Girls Field Hockey
Girls Slowpitch
Ultimate Frisbee
Track and Field
Curling
Mountain Biking
Badminton
Golf
Boys and Girls Soccer
Girls Rugby
Boys Rugby
Swim
Ski and Snowboard
Table Tennis
Tennis
Indoor Rock Climbing

A notable member of the Unionville High School hockey team was Cody Hodgson, who played for the Vancouver Canucks and the Buffalo Sabres in the NHL. An autographed jersey can be found in the school.

Clubs
The school is home to many clubs, although the number of clubs and their continuance varies per academic year. Some of the more longstanding clubs would include:

CHARIS Christian Fellowship
Chess Club
Chinese Cultural Association
Classical Music Appreciation
Community Involvement
DECA
Debate Society
Eco Action
Gender-Sexuality Alliance
Math Club
Trained Responders
Reader's Guild Society
Show Choir
UHS Charity Club
United Nations
Writers Anonymous Association

YRDSB International Languages Program

The YRDSB International Languages Program holds Cantonese, Greek, Japanese, and Mandarin classes for Senior Kindergarten to Grade 8 on various days of the week at Unionville High School.

Notable alumni
Lani Billard, actress
Steve Byers, actor
James Cade, actor
Christina Cox, actress
Emmanuelle Chriqui, actress
Hayden Christensen, actor
Chad Donella, actor
Justin Hines, singer-songwriter
Cody Hodgson, ice hockey player
Alexandre Lyssov, Canadian épée fencer
Matthew Knight, actor
Aviva Mongillo, actress
Connor Price, actor
Emanuel Sandhu, figure skater and dancer
Nathan Stephenson, actor
Iman Vellani, actress
Sarah Wells, hurdler
Ely Henry, actor
Shivon Zilis, venture capitalist and engineer

See also
List of high schools in Ontario

References

External links

Unionville High School
YRDSB Unionville H.S.

York Region District School Board
High schools in the Regional Municipality of York
Buildings and structures in Markham, Ontario
Educational institutions established in 1985
1985 establishments in Ontario